Lajos Tóth (25 August 1914 – 24 August 1984) was a Hungarian gymnast, born in Debrecen. He competed in gymnastics events at the 1936 Summer Olympics, 1948 Summer Olympics, and the 1952 Summer Olympics. He won a bronze medal with the Hungarian team at the 1948 Summer Olympics.

References

External links
 

1914 births
1984 deaths
People from Debrecen
Hungarian male artistic gymnasts
Gymnasts at the 1936 Summer Olympics
Gymnasts at the 1948 Summer Olympics
Gymnasts at the 1952 Summer Olympics
Olympic gymnasts of Hungary
Olympic bronze medalists for Hungary
Olympic medalists in gymnastics
Medalists at the 1948 Summer Olympics
20th-century Hungarian people